Sara Lawlor (born 11 November 1987) is an Irish international footballer who played for Peamount United of the Women's National League (WNL). She made her debut for the Republic of Ireland women's national football team in February 2012. A forward, Lawlor was the WNL Player of the Season in both 2011–12 and 2012–13.

Club career
Lawlor played her first match for Peamount United in January 2000 and featured in the club's FAI Women's Cup final defeat by Dundalk in 2005. She remained with the club for the inaugural 2011–12 Women's National League season, helping Peamount United win the title. She contributed 15 goals to Peamount's success, formed a "devastating" striking partnership with Stephanie Roche and was named Player of the Year at the inaugural end of season awards ceremony.

In 2012–13 Peamount lost their league title to Raheny United but the campaign was a personal triumph for Lawlor. The top goalscorer with 28 goals, she won a second consecutive Player of the Year award.

International career
At the girls' football tournament at the 2003 European Youth Olympic Festival, Lawlor scored in the third place play-off shootout as Ireland beat France on penalties after a 1–1 draw at Stade Sébastien Charléty in Paris. Lawlor was one of three nominees for the 2005 Under-19 Women's International Player of the Year, won by Niamh Fahey.

After noting her impressive form in the nascent Women's National League, national team coach Susan Ronan called Lawlor up to the senior Republic of Ireland squad for the first time ahead of the 2012 Algarve Cup. Lawlor made her debut in Ireland's opening match at the tournament, a 1–0 defeat by Hungary. She also represented Ireland at the 2013 Summer Universiade in July. In October 2013, Lawlor withdrew from the national squad with a knee injury.

References

External links

Sara Lawlor at Football Association of Ireland (FAI)

1987 births
Living people
Republic of Ireland women's association footballers
Republic of Ireland women's international footballers
Association footballers from Dublin (city)
Peamount United F.C. players
Women's National League (Ireland) players
Quinnipiac Bobcats women's soccer players
Expatriate women's soccer players in the United States
Republic of Ireland expatriate association footballers
Irish expatriate sportspeople in the United States
Dublin Women's Soccer League players
Women's association football forwards
Republic of Ireland women's youth international footballers